Ushaw Moor railway station, was a station on the Deerness Valley Railway,  south of the village of Ushaw Moor in County Durham, was opened on 1 September 1884 by the North Eastern Railway.

The station closed to passengers on 29 October 1951 and freight on 28 December 1964. The stone and timber built station was demolished and few traces of it remain. The trackbed now forms part of the Deerness Valley Railway Path.

References

External links
 Ushaw Moor on navigable 1948 O. S. map

Disused railway stations in County Durham
Former North Eastern Railway (UK) stations
Railway stations in Great Britain opened in 1884
Railway stations in Great Britain closed in 1951